Hibbertia lepidocalyx is a species of flowering plant in the family Dilleniaceae and is endemic to Western Australia. It is a shrub with thick, linear, cylindrical leaves and yellow flowers with nine or ten stamens in a single group on one side of the two carpels.

Description
There are nine or ten stamens fused at the base, on one side of the two scaly carpels that each contain three to six ovules.

Taxonomy
Hibbertia lepidocalyx was first formally described in 2002 Judith R. Wheeler in the journal Nuytsia from specimens collected near Lake King in 1968. The specific epithet (lepidocalyx) means "scaly sepals".

In the same journal, Wheeler described two subspecies and the names are accepted by the Australian Plant Census:

The subspecies epithet tuberculata mean refers to the wart-like lumps on the upper leaf surface.

Distribution and habitat
Subspecies lepidocalyx grows in mallee and shrubland in the Mallee biogeographic region, and subspecies tuberculata is found in woodland and heath but is only known from two populations in the Coolgardie bioregion.

Conservation status
Hibbertia lepidocalyx and subspecies lepidocalyx are classified as "not threatened" but susp. tuberculata is classified as "Priority Three" by the Government of Western Australia Department of Parks and Wildlife meaning that it is poorly known and known from only a few locations but is not under imminent threat.

See also
List of Hibbertia species

References

lepidocalyx
Flora of Western Australia
Plants described in 2002